The Band of the General Staff of the Armed Forces of Armenia is the central military band of the Armed Forces of Armenia. It is currently part of the Military Band Division of the General Staff of the armed forces.

Overview

History
On 28 January 1992, by order of the Minister of Defense Vazgen Sargsyan, the 1st Airborne Regiment was formed, which also included the first military band in Armenia. On 14 September of that year, Sargsyan created the Military Band Service of the Ministry of Defense, which was removed from the Ministry of Defense's structure and transferred to the General Staff on 25 January 1996. The actual band of the general staff was formed on 25 November 1992 by the band's current director Armen Poghosyan. On 2 February 2009, the service was reapproved as a military division.

Events
Domestically, it cooperates with the honour guard of the Defense Ministry and has a separate branch in the battalion. The band has performed in parades, tattoos, and state ceremonies, such as a joint concert between the General Staff Band and a band from the United Kingdom, honoring the 25th anniversary of diplomatic relations. The band has also performed in military tattoos, such as the Spasskaya Tower military tattoo in 2017. The band performed as a guest contingent in the Liberation Day Parade in Stepanakert in 2012. In 2013, during his state visit to Armenia, the President of Belarus Alexander Lukashenko praised the band, including its director Armen Poghosyan for its performance of My Belarusy (the Belarusian national anthem), showing a thumbs up as a sign of gratitude and telling Poghosyan: When the Band of the General Staff performed in February 2019 at the opening ceremony of IDEX 2019 in Abu Dhabi, The National (a private English-language daily newspaper based out of the United Arab Emirates) published an article describing the performance of the band and its appellant effect on the audience:

"No-one was quite sure why the Armenian Military Orchestra was taking part until they started, that is. Armenia, it turns out, is a superpower in the world of military orchestras. A general fearlessly marched a gauntlet of swords slashing up and down in perfect symmetry, allowing him the pass through unharmed. An impressed Sheikh Mohamed bin Zayed, Crown Prince of Abu Dhabi and Deputy Supreme Commander of the Armed Forces, and Sheikh Mohammed bin Rashid, Vice President and Ruler of Dubai, were pictured on big screens leading the applause"

As of January 2016, the band took part in 1,700 governmental events.

Personnel
Currently, potential musicians participate in 5-year training courses at the Military Institute of Military Conductors of the Military University of the Ministry of Defense of the Russian Federation. Since 2004, an agreement with the Komitas State Conservatory of Yerevan has been in place, under which five conductors a year were prepared for the band, which gave it the opportunity to replenish all bands with qualified personnel. Since 2019, it was decided to send musicians to study in military schools in order to receive the education of a full-fledged conductor. Citizens of a pre-draft age, as well as male citizens and military personnel who have passed or are undergoing compulsory military service (whose age does not exceed 23 years), can take part in admission to military schools. 60 percent of the band are contract soldiers, with the rest being military conscripts.

Ceremonial repertoire

Armenian music 
 Presidential Fanfare
 Zangezur Stage
 Defile March (by Yuri Kasparov)
 Festive Yerevan March
 Erebouni
 Our name is Armenian Army
 I have the honor (by Armen Poghosyan)

Ten songs by Goosan Haykazun are performed by the band such as the following marches:

Getashen
Armenians let us unite
Come zoravar
Dance Artsakh people 

Most of the songs he wrote were written while participating in Artsakh War.

Foreign music 
The band has a large repertoire of foreign music, which primarily includes traditional Georgian folk music and Russian marching music.

 Farewell of Slavianka
 Den Pobedy
 The Sacred War
 Ballad of a Soldier
 March of the Preobrazhensky Regiment
 Jubilee Slow March "25 Years of the Red Army"

Awards 

 First Place in the International Military Festival in Sweden (2010)
 First Place in the St. Petersburg festival of military band (2008)

See also 
 Armen Poghosyan (military musician)
 Honour Guard Battalion (Armenia)
 Presidential Band of the Russian Federation

References

External links 
Websites
 Official government page 
Videos
 The band playing a traditional georgian song.
 A joint performance with the Salamanca Band.
 The band and the "Yerevan Drums" at the International Military Music Festival “Spasskaya Tower” 2017.
 The band playing March «Defile»
 An interview with Armen Poghosyan
 The Armenian Presidential Military Band in Yerevan
 Yerevan Philharmonic Hall Performance
 Զինուժ / Zinuj / Зинуж 02.12.17
 ՀՀ ԶՈՒ նվագախումբը շնորհավորում է կանանց ապրիլի 7-ը

Military bands
Military units and formations of Armenia
Ministry of Defence (Armenia)